80 series may refer to:

 KiHa 80 series diesel multiple unit initially operated by the Japanese National Railways
 80 series electric multiple unit initially operated by the Japanese National Railways

See also 

 HP series 80 consumer grade computers produced by Hewlett-Packard